Kletus Vilhelm "Wille" Andersson (11 March 1891 – 21 September 1933) was a Swedish water polo player and freestyle swimmer. He competed in water polo at the 1908, 1912, 1920 and 1924 Summer Olympics and won a silver medal in 1912 and a bronze in 1920, finishing fourth in 1924. In swimming he competed at the 1908 and 1912 Olympics and won 18 national titles between 1909 and 1920.

He was the son of Cletus William Andersson, a dentist. His younger brother Erik Cletus Thule Andersson also competed in water polo at the 1924 Olympics.

See also
 List of Olympic medalists in water polo (men)

References

External links

 

1891 births
1933 deaths
Swedish male water polo players
Swedish male freestyle swimmers
Olympic water polo players of Sweden
Olympic swimmers of Sweden
Swimmers at the 1908 Summer Olympics
Swimmers at the 1912 Summer Olympics
Water polo players at the 1912 Summer Olympics
Water polo players at the 1920 Summer Olympics
Water polo players at the 1924 Summer Olympics
Olympic silver medalists for Sweden
Olympic bronze medalists for Sweden
Olympic medalists in water polo
Medalists at the 1920 Summer Olympics
Medalists at the 1912 Summer Olympics
SK Neptun water polo players
Sportspeople from Stockholm
20th-century Swedish people